Atapuerca may refer to:

 Atapuerca, Province of Burgos, the town next to the archaeological site
 Atapuerca Mountains and the associated archaeological site of Atapuerca, an ancient karstic region of Burgos, Spain, containing the earliest known hominin fossils in Western Europe
 Archaeological site of Atapuerca
 Battle of Atapuerca, a medieval battle between the Kingdom of Castile and the Kingdom of Navarre
 27952 Atapuerca, an asteroid discovered in 1997